Tlaxcala ( 'place of maize tortillas') was a pre-Columbian city and state in central Mexico.

During the Spanish conquest of the Aztec Empire, Tlaxcala allied with the Spanish Empire against the Aztecs, supplying a large contingent for and sometimes most of the Spanish-led army that eventually destroyed the Aztec Empire.

Tlaxcala was completely surrounded by Aztec lands, leading to the intermittent so called "flower war" between the Aztecs and the Tlaxcalans, fighting for their independence, as the Aztecs wanted to absorb them into the empire.

History

The Tlaxcalans arrived in Central Mexico during the Late Postclassic. They first settled near Texcoco in the valley of Mexico, between the settlement of Cohuatlinchan and the shore of Lake Texcoco. After some years the Tlaxcallans were driven out of the valley of Mexico and moved to the east, splitting into three groups along the way. While one group continued north towards the modern state of Hidalgo and another remained in the vicinity of Texcoco, a third group arrived in the modern valley of Tlaxcala, where they established the city of Tepetícpac Texcallan under the leadership of Culhuatecuhtli Quanex.

Over the subsequent years, the Tlaxcallan state expanded with the foundations of Ocotelulco and Tizatlán. The fourth major settlement, Quiahuiztlan, was founded by members of the Tlaxcallan group that had initially remained in the valley of Mexico.

Government
Ancient Tlaxcala was a republic ruled by a council of between 50 and 200 chief political officials (teuctli [sg.], teteuctin [pl.]) (Fargher et al. 2010).  These officials gained their positions through service to the state, usually in warfare, and as a result came from both the noble (pilli) and commoner (macehualli)  classes.

Contact with conquistadors
Tlaxcala was never conquered by the Aztec empire, but was engaged in a state of perpetual war, the so-called flower wars or garland wars.

Conquistador Bernal Díaz del Castillo describes the first battle between the Spanish force and the Tlaxcalteca as surprisingly difficult. He writes that they probably would not have survived, had not Xicotencatl the Elder, and Maxixcatzin, persuaded Xicotencatl the Younger – the Tlaxcallan warleader – that it would be better to ally with the newcomers than to kill them.

Xicohtencatl the Younger was later condemned by the Tlaxcaltecan ruling council and hanged by Cortés for desertion in April 1521 during the siege of Tenochtitlan.

Due to protracted warfare between the Aztecs and the Tlaxcala, the Tlaxcala were eager to exact revenge, and soon became loyal allies of the Spanish. Even after the Spanish were expelled from Tenochtitlan, the Tlaxcala continued to support their conquest. Tlaxcala also assisted the Spanish in the conquest of Guatemala.

As a result of their alliance with the Spaniards, Tlaxcala had  privileged status within Spanish colonial Mexico. After the Spanish conquered Tenochtitlan and the rest of Mexico, Tlaxcala was allowed to survive and preserve its pre-Columbian culture. In addition, as a reward to the Tlaxcalans unyielding loyalty to the Spanish, the city and its inhabitants largely escaped the pillaging and destruction following the Spanish conquest. The Tlaxcalans gave further assistance in the Mixtón War.

Following the Spanish Conquest, Tlaxcala was divided into four fiefdoms by the Spanish corregidor Gómez de Santillán in 1545 (26 years after the Conquest). These fiefdoms were Ocotelolco, Quiahuiztlan, Tepeticpac, and Tizatlan. At this time, four great houses or lineages emerged and claimed hereditary rights to each fiefdom and created fictitious genealogies extending back into the pre-Columbian era to justify their claims.

During the colonial period, Tlaxcala's "part in the conquest of the Aztec 'empire,' her favored treatment by the Spanish crown, her unique talent for propaganda and litigation, her astonishing enterprise" gave the small state an important place in Mexican history.

In the 16th and 17th centuries Tlaxcala settlers went to live in new northern colonies to protect Mexico from the Chichimecas.

See also
Tlaxcaltec – Nahuatl for inhabitants of Tlaxcala
Tlaxcala – the present day Mexican state
Tlaxcala, Tlaxcala – the present day capital of the state of Tlaxcala

References

Sources
 Diego Muñoz Camargo's History of Tlaxcala (Lienzo de Tlaxcala), written in or before 1585, is an illustrated codex describing the conquest of Mexico.  It was painted by Tlaxcalteca artists under Spanish supervision.
 Crónica Mexicayotl was written by Fernando Alvarado Tezozomoc, in Nahuatl and Spanish, in the last decades of the 16th century.

Bibliography
Alvarado Tezozomoc, Fernando (1944). Crónica Mexicana. Mexico: Manuel Orozco y Berra, Leyenda.
Fargher, Lane F., Richard E. Blanton and Verenice Y. Heredia Espinoza (2010). Egalitarian Ideology and Political Power in Prehispanic Central Mexico: The Case of Tlaxcallan. "Latin American Antiquity," 21(3):227–251.
Gibson, Charles (1952). Tlaxcala in the Sixteenth Century. New Haven: Yale University Press.
Hassig, Ross (2001). "Xicotencatl: rethinking an indigenous Mexican hero", Estudios de Cultura Nahuatl, UNAM.
Hicks, Frederic (2009). Land and Succession in the Indigenous Noble Houses of Sixteenth-Century Tlaxcala. Ethnohistory, 56:4, 569–588.
Muñoz Camargo, Diego (1982) [1892]. Historia de Tlaxcala. Alfredo Chavero. México.

Our lady of assumption ex convent. Bienvenidos al INAH. (n.d.). Retrieved November 30, 2021, from https://www.inah.gob.mx/en/english/4181-our-lady-of-assumption-ex-convent.

External links
Spanish language description of the historiography of Tlaxcala
Article in Sciencemag about archeological findings at Tizatlan

Complex altepetl
Former confederations
History of Tlaxcala
Indigenous peoples in Mexico
History of New Spain
Spanish conquests in the Americas
Former countries in North America